CESP may refer to:
Citizens for East Shore Parks (CESP), American environmental organization 
Companhia Energética de São Paulo, electricity company, São Paulo, Brazil
Community Energy Saving Programme, a UK Government program funding energy efficiency improvements and installation of low and zero carbon heating technologies in income deprived areas.